Kim Min-woo (born December 17, 1993), known professionally as Slom, is a South Korean music producer. He first garnered attention when he appeared on Show Me the Money 10 as judge and producer in 2021. He released collaborative album Miniseries with singer-songwriter Sumin in the same year, which received critical acclaim.

Early life and education 
Kim Min-woo was born on December 17, 1993 in Palo Alto, California. He started making music in 2014. He was influenced by Dibiase, Evil Needle, Mr. Carmack, and Kaytranada. As he looks like a sloth, he adopted the stage name "Slom" which is a portmanteau of sloth and Min-woo.

He graduated from UCLA with a bachelor's degree in sociology.

Career 
In 2019, Slom released his debut single "2Nite". In September 2021, he released collaborative album Miniseries with singer-songwriter Sumin, which received critical acclaim. In October, he appeared on Show Me the Money 10 as judge and producer. In 2022, he signed to Standard Friends, a label found by Zion.T. He appeared on Show Me the Money 11 as judge and producer and released his debut studio album Weather Report.

Discography

Studio album

Collaborative album

Single

Filmography

Television

Awards and nominations

References

External link 

 

1993 births
Living people
Musicians from California
South Korean record producers
University of California, Los Angeles alumni